Edgardo Codesal Méndez (born 2 June 1951 in Montevideo, Uruguay) is a Uruguayan-Mexican football (soccer) referee, who controlled the final match of the 1990 World Cup held in Italy.

Career
His grandfather was from Argentina, and his father, José Maria Codesal, was a referee in the 1966 FIFA World Cup. As a child he remembered his father refereeing. Edgardo was passionate about football, played in childhood Baby Football teams in the area and in his teens he played as goalkeeper for the Club Atlético Cerro of Montevideo.

He began his career as a referee in Uruguay in 1976. By 1977 he had his debut match in the Primera División Uruguaya refereeing Cerro vs Huracán.

In 1980, he traveled to Mexico where he had contact with the Mexican Football Federation. He advanced in his refereeing, starting to referee international matches and finals in Mexico.

Codesal represented  Mexico, as a CONCACAF referee in the 1990 World Cup. Among his international posts, Codesal was CONCACAF's director of referees, head of refereeing for the FIFA Women's World Cup USA 1999, and member of the refereeing committee for the FIFA World U-20 Championship in Nigeria, the Confederations Cup in Mexico and the FIFA World U-17 Championship in New Zealand.

In 2016 he was attacked during a match as a spectator while serving as head of the FMF referees’ commission. The culprit - Veracruz owner Fidel Kuri was banned for attending matches for 12 months and was fined 146,080 Mexican pesos.

1990 World Cup
FIFA observers rated Codesal 8.5 for his refereeing performance at the 1990 World Cup.  Codesal had refereed the Italy vs USA match in the first round (group A), won by Italy 1-0. He refereed the quarter-final between England vs Cameroon, awarding three penalties - one to Cameroon and two to England. England won 3-2 to move into the semi-finals. Codesal was credited with keeping control of a potentially difficult match over a period of 120 minutes.

Final
Codesal was appointed for the World Cup Final, which featured  Argentina and West Germany. In the 83rd minute, Codesal awarded West Germany a penalty kick for a foul by Roberto Sensini against Rudi Völler. Andreas Brehme converted the penalty kick to give West Germany their third World Cup title.

Codesal became the first referee to send off a player in a final match of a FIFA World Cup, by showing the red card to Argentines Monzón and Dezotti.  Monzón was given a direct red after a  tackle on Jürgen Klinsmann. Dezotti was sent off near the end for a tussle with Jürgen Kohler. During the final Codesal booked Diego Maradona for dissent.  

Codesal retired from refereeing at the top level shortly after the 1990 World Cup.

References

External links
Brehme recognises there was no foul (Spanish)

/ Edgardo Codesal Méndez

Uruguayan football referees
Mexican football referees
Uruguayan emigrants to Mexico
1990 FIFA World Cup referees
FIFA World Cup referees
Olympic football referees
Sportspeople from Montevideo
Place of birth missing (living people)
Living people
1951 births